Aneilema is a genus of monocotyledonous plants of approximately 60 species. The vast majority of the species are native to sub-Saharan Africa, but a few are found in Oceania and one, Aneilema brasiliense, is from South America. It is the third largest genus in the family Commelinaceae after Commelina and Tradescantia, and it is one of only six genera in the family to occur in both the Eastern Hemisphere and the Western Hemisphere.

Aneilema consists of herbs that may be either perennial or annual. They are characterised by their zygomorphic flowers which, unlike the closely related genus Commelina, usually lack a modified leaf enclosing the flower stalk at maturity. The uppermost leaf on the flowering stalk is often highly modified, however, and in a few species, such as Aneilema clarkei, the upper leaf does completely surround the inflorescence.  The flowering stalks of Aneilema tend to be much larger than those of Commelina, with some species having inflorescences of more than 25 cm in length, although some are as short as 2 cm.

 Species
 Aneilema acuminatum R.Br. - New Guinea, Maluku, Solomon Islands, Queensland, New South Wales 
 Aneilema aequinoctiale   - tropical + southern Africa
 Aneilema alatum Koord. - Java
 Aneilema angolense C.B.Clarke - Angola
 Aneilema aparine H.Perrier - Madagascar
 Aneilema arenicola Faden - KwaZulu-Natal, Mozambique
 Aneilema benadirense Chiov. - Somalia
 Aneilema beniniense (P.Beauv.) Kunth - tropical Africa
 Aneilema biflorum  - Queensland, New South Wales 
 Aneilema brasiliense C.B.Clarke - Brazil, Venezuela
 Aneilema brenanianum Faden - Kenya, Tanzania
 Aneilema brunneospermum Faden - Mozambique, Eswatini, South Africa
 Aneilema calceolus Brenan - Kenya, Tanzania
 Aneilema chrysopogon Brenan - Zambia, Tanzania
 Aneilema clarkei Rendle - Kenya, Tanzania
 Aneilema dispermum Brenan - Malawi, Tanzania
 Aneilema dregeanum Kunth - Mozambique, Eswatini, South Africa; naturalized in Vietnam
 Aneilema ephemerum Faden - Kenya
 Aneilema forsskalii Kunth - Ethiopia, Sudan, Djibouti, Yemen, Oman, Saudi Arabia
 Aneilema gillettii Brenan - Ethiopia, Kenya
 Aneilema grandibracteolatum Faden - Ethiopia
 Aneilema hirtum A.Rich. - eastern Africa from Ethiopia to Zambia
 Aneilema hockii De Wild - eastern + southern Africa
 Aneilema homblei De Wild - DRC
 Aneilema indehiscens Faden - eastern + southern Africa
 Aneilema johnstonii K.Schum.  - eastern + southern Africa
 Aneilema lamuense Faden - Kenya, Somalia
 Aneilema lanceolatum Benth. - tropical Africa
 Aneilema leiocaule K.Schum.  - eastern + central Africa
 Aneilema longicapsa Faden - Somalia
 Aneilema longirrhizum Faden - Northern Province of South Africa
 Aneilema macrorrhizum T.C.E.Fr. - Tanzania, Zimbabwe, Zambia
 Aneilema minutiflorum Faden - Kenya, Tanzania, Uganda
 Aneilema mortonii Brenan - Ghana, Togo
 Aneilema neocaledonicum Schltr. - Vanuatu, New Caledonia
 Aneilema nicholsonii C.B.Clarke - eastern + southern Africa
 Aneilema nyasense C.B.Clarke - southeastern Africa
 Aneilema obbiadense Chiov. - Somalia
 Aneilema paludosum A.Chev. - western Africa
 Aneilema pedunculosum C.B.Clarke - southeastern Africa
 Aneilema petersii (Hassk.) C.B.Clarke  - eastern + southeastern Africa
 Aneilema plagiocapsa K.Schum. - DRC, Zambia, Angola
 Aneilema pomeridianum Stanf. & Brenan - Nigeria, Niger, Togo, Benin, Ghana 
 Aneilema pusillum Chiov. - Kenya, Somalia, Ethiopia
 Aneilema recurvatum Faden - Kenya, Uganda, Ethiopia, Tanzania
 Aneilema rendlei C.B.Clarke - Kenya, Ethiopia, Tanzania
 Aneilema richardsiae Brenan - DRC, Zambia, Tanzania
 Aneilema schlechteri K.Schum. - Zimbabwe, Transvaal, Eswatini
 Aneilema sclerocarpum F.Muell. - Queensland
 Aneilema sebitense Faden - Kenya, Ethiopia
 Aneilema setiferum A.Chev. - western Africa
 Aneilema siliculosum R.Br. - Queensland, Northern Territory
 Aneilema silvaticum   - Nigeria, Togo, Cameroon, Bioko, Zaïre 
 Aneilema somaliense C.B.Clarke - Kenya, Somalia, Ethiopia
 Aneilema spekei C.B.Clarke  - eastern Africa
 Aneilema succulentum Faden - Kenya
 Aneilema tanaense Faden - Kwale District of Kenya
 Aneilema taylorii C.B.Clarke  - Kenya, Tanzania
 Aneilema termitarium Faden - Zaïre, Zambia, Tanzania
 Aneilema trispermum Faden - Somalia
 Aneilema umbrosum (Vahl) Kunth - tropical Africa; tropical South America, Trinidad, Costa Rica, Panama
 Aneilema usambarense Faden - Usambara Mountains of Tanzania
 Aneilema welwitschii C.B.Clarke - central + southern Africa
 Aneilema woodii Faden - Yemen
 Aneilema zebrinum Chiov. ex Chiarugi - - Kenya, Ethiopia, Tanzania, KwaZulu-Natal

References

External links

 
Commelinales genera
Taxonomy articles created by Polbot